Échallens District was a district of the Canton of Vaud, Switzerland. The seat of the district was the town of Échallens.

The district was dissolved on 31 August 2006 and all the municipalities transferred to the new Gros-de-Vaud District on the following day.

The following municipalities were located within the district:

 Assens 
 Bercher 
 Bioley-Orjulaz
 Bottens
 Bretigny-sur-Morrens 
 Cugy 
 Dommartin 
 Échallens 
 Éclagnens 
 Essertines-sur-Yverdon 
 Étagnières 
 Fey 
 Froideville 
 Goumoens-la-Ville 
 Goumoens-le-Jux 
 Malapalud 
 Morrens 
 Naz 
 Oulens-sous-Échallens 
 Pailly 
 Penthéréaz 
 Poliez-le-Grand 
 Poliez-Pittet 
 Rueyres 
 Saint-Barthélemy
 Sugnens
 Villars-le-Terroir 
 Villars-Tiercelin 
 Vuarrens

References

Former districts of the canton of Vaud
Former condominiums of Switzerland